The defending champion was Paolo Canè but he did not participate, in 1990. The fourth seeded, Richard Fromberg from Australia won the singles title.

Seeds 
A champion seed is indicated in bold text while text in italics indicates the round in which that seed was eliminated.

Draw

References 

Men's Singles
Singles